is a Japanese television personality and model represented by TakeOff.

Filmography

TV series

Radio series

Advertising

Music videos

References

External links
 

Japanese entertainers
Japanese television presenters
Japanese male models
1985 births
Living people
People from Tokyo
Japanese people of British descent
People educated at Winchester College